Merhynchites is a genus of leaf and bud weevils in the beetle family Attelabidae. There are about 12 described species in Merhynchites.

Species
These 12 species belong to the genus Merhynchites:

 Merhynchites bicolor (Fabricius, 1775) (rose curculio)
 Merhynchites cockerelli Pierce, 1913
 Merhynchites creticus Voss, 1955
 Merhynchites hungaricus Sharp, 1889
 Merhynchites palmi Hamilton, 1979
 Merhynchites palmii (Schaeffer, 1905)
 Merhynchites piceus Pierce, 1913
 Merhynchites ruber Fairmaire
 Merhynchites tricarinatus (Green, 1920)
 Merhynchites ventralis Pierce, 1913
 Merhynchites viridilustrans Pierce, 1913
 Merhynchites wickhami (Cockerell, 1912) (western rose curculio)

References

Further reading

 
 

Attelabidae
Articles created by Qbugbot